Lupghar Pir pass (el. ) is a high mountain pass  to the west of village Lupghar in the upper Hunza valley in Gojal tehsil of Gilgit district in Gilgit-Baltistan, Pakistan.

References

Mountain passes of Gilgit-Baltistan
Mountain passes of the Hindu Kush